The Alexandra, also known as Lockerbie Court, is a historic apartment building located at Indianapolis, Indiana.  It was built in 1902, and is a three-story, red brick and grey limestone building on a raised basement with Georgian Revival style detailing.  It features six three-story polygonal bay windows on the front facade.

It was listed on the National Register of Historic Places in 1983.

References

Apartment buildings in Indiana
Residential buildings on the National Register of Historic Places in Indiana
Residential buildings completed in 1902
Georgian Revival architecture in Indiana
Residential buildings in Indianapolis
National Register of Historic Places in Indianapolis